Matěj Luksch (born 19 June 1998) is a Czech professional footballer who plays as a goalkeeper for FK Železiarne Podbrezová, on loan from Dynamo České Budějovice.

Club career

Dynamo České Budějovice
After playing for the youth teams, Luksch began his senior career with the reserves squad of his local club, Dynamo České Budějovice, in the summer of 2019. He competed in Czech 4th tier - in Divize A, where he collected 14 starts for the reserves squad. He was also the third goalkeeper for the first squad, but did not make an appearance in any game.

Loan at FK Pohronie
On 8 February 2020, Dynamo České Budějovice had announced, that Luksch will depart for Slovak, Žiar nad Hronom-based club of FK Pohronie. He was understood to be a second, an alternate goalkeeper to long-term number one for the club, Tomáš Jenčo.

Luksch enjoyed his first match nomination on 22 February 2020, in a home fixture against Žilina. He did not feature in the game. Pohronie lost narrowly, 0:1. A week ago, at pod Zoborom, against Nitra, Samuel Dovec was preferred instead of him. Luksch appeared in one of the friendly games prior to Fortuna Liga restart, on 30 May 2020, in a 3:1 victory over Ružomberok, marking his first match appearance for the club since his signing.

During his spell for Pohronie, Luksch made no competitive appearances.

Tatran Liptovský Mikuláš
Luksch had signed with Tatran Liptovský Mikuláš in the summer of 2020.

References

External links
 
 Dynamo České Budějovice profile

 

1998 births
Living people
Sportspeople from České Budějovice
Czech footballers
Czech expatriate footballers
Association football goalkeepers
SK Dynamo České Budějovice players
FK Pohronie players
MFK Tatran Liptovský Mikuláš players
FK Železiarne Podbrezová players
2. Liga (Slovakia) players
Expatriate footballers in Slovakia
Czech expatriate sportspeople in Slovakia